Manzano Springs is a census-designated place (CDP) in Torrance and Bernalillo counties, New Mexico, United States. The population was 137 at the 2010 census. It is part of the Albuquerque Metropolitan Statistical Area.

Geography
Manzano Springs is located in northwestern Torrance County and extends west into southeastern Bernalillo County. The main road through the CDP is New Mexico State Road 222.

Demographics

Education
It is zoned to Moriarty Municipal Schools, all parts in both counties included.

References

Census-designated places in Torrance County, New Mexico
Census-designated places in Bernalillo County, New Mexico
Census-designated places in New Mexico
Albuquerque metropolitan area